Autonomy  is a BBC Books original novel written by Daniel Blythe and based on the long-running British science fiction television series Doctor Who. It features the Tenth Doctor without an official companion. It was released on 3 September 2009, alongside The Taking of Chelsea 426 and The Krillitane Storm. The Doctor visits Hyperville and encounters his nemesis, the Autons.

Plot summary
Hyperville is 2013's top hi-tech, 24-hour entertainment complex - a sprawling palace of fun under one massive roof. A place to go shopping, or experience the excitement of Doomcastle, Winterland, or Wild West World. But things are about to get a lot more exciting - and dangerous. But what exactly is lurking on Level Zero of Hyperville? And what will happen when the entire complex goes over to Central Computer Control?

See also

Whoniverse

References

External links

2009 British novels
2009 science fiction novels
Tenth Doctor novels